The 4th CC.NN. Division "3 Gennaio" was an Italian CC.NN. (Blackshirts militia) division raised on 25 June 1935 for the Second Italo-Ethiopian War against Ethiopia. The name "3 Gennaio" ("3 January") was chosen to commemorate the date of assumption of dictatorial powers by Benito Mussolini on 3 January 1925. The division took part in the Italian invasion of Egypt and was destroyed during the Battle of Sidi Barrani in December 1940.

History 
The division was one of six CC.NN. divisions raised in summer 1935 in preparation for the Second Italo-Ethiopian War. Its members were volunteers from the various armed militias of the National Fascist Party's paramilitary wing. Its members came from two regions: the 101st and 104th CC.NN. legions from Piedmont and the 215th CC.NN. Legion from Lazio.

Second Italo-Ethiopian War 
The division assembled in Italian Eritrea in early November 1935 and moved to Macallè in Ethiopia. The division participated in the Battle of Amba Aradam. After the war the division was repatriated and then disbanded.

World War II  
The division was reformed in 1940 and sent with three other CC.NN. divisions to Italian Libya, where the division took part in the Italian invasion of Egypt in September 1940. By December 1940 the division was encamped at Sidi Barrani, where it was destroyed during the British counter-offensive Operation Compass in the Battle of Sidi Barrani on 10-11 December 1940.

Organization

1935 
Below follows the division's organization during the Second Italo-Ethiopian War and the cities, in which its CC.NN. battalions were raised; the legion's machine gun companies and artillery batteries were raised in the same cities as the legions.

 4th CC.NN. Division "3 Gennaio"
 101st CC.NN. Legion "Sabauda", in Turin
 Command Company
 CI CC.NN. Battalion, in Turin
 CII CC.NN. Battalion, in Turin
 101st CC.NN. Machine Gun Company
 101st CC.NN. Artillery Battery (65/17 infantry support guns)
 104th CC.NN. Legion "Santorre di Santarosa", in Alessandria
 Command Company
 CIV CC.NN. Battalion, in Alessandria
 CXI CC.NN. Battalion, in Casale Monferrato
 104th CC.NN. Machine Gun Company
 104th CC.NN. Artillery Battery (65/17 infantry support guns)
 215th CC.NN. Legion "Del Cimino", in Viterbo
 Command Company
 CCXV CC.NN. Battalion, in Viterbo
 CCXX CC.NN. Battalion, in Rome
 215th CC.NN. Machine Gun Company
 215th CC.NN. Artillery Battery (65/17 infantry support guns)
 IV CC.NN. Machine Gun Battalion
 IV Artillery Group (65/17 infantry support guns, Royal Italian Army)
 IV Mixed Transport Unit (Royal Italian Army)
 IV Supply Unit (Royal Italian Army)
 2x CC.NN. replacement battalions
 4th Special Engineer Company (Mixed CC.NN. and Royal Italian Army)
 4th Medical Section (Royal Italian Army)
 4th Supply Section (Royal Italian Army)
 4th Carabinieri Section

The supply unit had 1,600 mules and the mixed transport unit 80 light trucks. The division engaged in war crimes in Ethiopia during the Second Italo-Ethiopian War.

1940 
Below follows the division's organization at the start of the Italian invasion of Egypt and the cities, in which its CC.NN. battalions were raised.

  4th CC.NN. Division "3 Gennaio"
 250th CC.NN. Legion, in Barletta
 Command Company
 CL CC.NN. Battalion, in Barletta
 CLIV CC.NN. Battalion, in Taranto
 CLVI CC.NN. Battalion, in Potenza
 250th CC.NN. Machine Gun Company
 270th CC.NN. Legion, in Agrigento
 Command Company
 CLXX CC.NN. Battalion, in Agrigento
 CLXXII CC.NN. Battalion, in Enna
 CLXXIV CC.NN. Battalion, in Trapani
 270th CC.NN. Machine Gun Company
 204th Motorized Artillery Regiment (Royal Italian Army)
 Command Unit
 I Group (100/17 howitzers)
 II Group (75/27 field guns)
 III Group (75/27 field guns)
 2x Anti-aircraft batteries (20/65 Mod. 35 anti-aircraft guns)
 Ammunition and Supply Unit
 CCIV Machine Gun Battalion (Royal Italian Army)
 CCIV Mixed Engineer Battalion (Royal Italian Army)
 Command Platoon
 1x Engineer Company
 1x Telegraph and Radio Operators Company
 1x Searchlight Section
 204th CC.NN. Anti-tank Company (47/32 anti-tank guns)
 204th CC.NN. Support Weapons Battery (65/17 infantry support guns)
 204th CC.NN. Mortar Company (81mm Mod. 35 mortars)
 204th Transport Section (Royal Italian Army)
 204th Supply Section (Royal Italian Army)
 204th Medical Section (Royal Italian Army)
 3x Field hospitals
 1x Surgical Unit
 707th Carabinieri Section
 708th Carabinieri Section
 304th Field Post Office

CC.NN. Grouping "3 Gennaio" 
For the Italian participation in the Eastern Front the regiment-sized CC.NN. Grouping "3 Gennaio" was raised as unit of the Italian Army in Russia:

 CC.NN. Grouping "3 Gennaio"
 CC.NN. Battalions Group "Tagliamento"
 Command Company
 LXIII CC.NN. Assault Battalion, in Udine
 LXXIX CC.NN. Assault Battalion, in Reggio Emilia
 LXIII Support Weapons Battalion (Royal Italian Army)
 CC.NN. Battalions Group "Montebello"
 Command Company
 VI CC.NN. Assault Battalion, in Vigevano
 XXX CC.NN. Assault Battalion, in Novara
 XII  Support Weapons Battalion, in Aosta

Commanding officers 
During the Second Italo-Ethiopian War:

 Generale di Divisione Alessandro Traditi (1935 - 1937)

During the Italian invasion of Egypt:

 Generale di Divisione Fabio Merzari (1940 - 11 December 1940, POW)

References

Sources 
 
 George F. Nafziger – Italian Order of Battle: An organizational history of the Italian Army in World War II (3 vol)

Divisions of Italy of the Second Italo-Ethiopian War
Blackshirt divisions of Italy
Divisions of Italy in World War II